The grasshopper is a fairy chess piece that moves along , , and  (as a queen) but only by hopping over another piece. The piece to be hopped may be any distance away, but the grasshopper must land on the square immediately behind it in the same direction. If there is no piece to hop over, it cannot move. If the square beyond a piece is occupied by a piece of the opposite color, the grasshopper can capture that piece. The grasshopper may jump over pieces of either color; the piece being jumped over is unaffected.

The grasshopper was introduced by T. R. Dawson in 1913 in problems published in the Cheltenham Examiner newspaper. It is one of the most popular fairy pieces used in chess problems.

In this article, the grasshopper is shown as an inverted queen with notation G.

Movement

In the diagram to the right, the white grasshopper on d4 can move to the squares marked with crosses (b2, d1, d7, and h8) or capture the black pawn on a7. It cannot move to g4, as there are two pieces to hop over.

Example problem

Solution: 
1. Gh3 Gh4 2. Gh5 Gh6 3. Gh7 Gh8 4.Ge7 Gd7 5. Gc7 Gb7 6. Ga7+ Ga6 7. Ga5+ Ga4 8. Ga3

Related pieces
Other related pieces in the problemist tradition are the eagle, hamster, moose, and sparrow, which move and capture like the grasshopper but are deflected (to either side) 90°, 180°, 45°, and 135°, respectively, upon passing the hurdle.

See also
 Grasshopper chess
 Xiangqi and janggi feature a cannon with similar abilities

References

Bibliography

External links
Piececlopedia: Grasshopper by Hans Bodlaender, The Chess Variant Pages

Fairy chess pieces
1913 introductions